Lena Isaksson is a Swedish ski-orienteering competitor. She won a silver medal in the classic distance at the 1984 World Ski Orienteering Championships in Lavarone, and a gold medal in the relay, together with Marie Gustafsson and Ann Larsson.

References

Swedish orienteers
Female orienteers
Ski-orienteers
Year of birth missing (living people)
Living people
20th-century Swedish women